The Elphin Sports Centre (formerly known as Dowling Street Stadium) is an indoor sporting venue located in Launceston, Tasmania. Construction commenced at the centre in 1964 and was opened in August the following year.

Launceston Casino City played in the National Basketball League (NBL) between 1980 and 1982. During this time, they played their home games at Dowling Street Stadium.

References

External links

Official website

Sports venues in Tasmania
Velodromes in Australia
Buildings and structures in Launceston, Tasmania
Basketball venues in Australia
1964 establishments in Australia
Sports venues completed in 1964
Basketball in Tasmania